Skorošice is a municipality and village in Jeseník District in the Olomouc Region of the Czech Republic. It has about 700 inhabitants.

Administrative parts
The village of Petrovice is an administrative part of Skorošice.

History
The first written mention of Skorošice is from 1290.

During the World War II, the German occupiers operated the E168 and E790 forced labour subcamps of the Stalag VIII-B/344 prisoner-of-war camp in the village. Allied POWs of various nationalities including British and French were imprisoned there.

References

External links

Villages in Jeseník District
Czech Silesia